Nine ships and a base of the Royal Navy have borne the name HMS Curlew after the bird, the curlew:

  was a 16-gun brig sloop launched in 1795 that foundered in 1796.
  was a 16-gun sloop, previously named Leander, purchased in 1803 and sold in 1810.
  was an 18-gun brig sloop of the  launched in 1812 and sold in 1822  for use in the opium trade, being renamed Jamesina.
  was a 10-gun brig sloop of the  launched in 1830 and broken up in 1840.
  was a  screw sloop launched in 1854 and sold in 1865.
  was a  launched in 1868 and sold in 1882.
  was a torpedo gunvessel launched in 1885 and sold in 1906.
  was a  launched in 1917 and sunk in 1940.
She was paid off in 1990, and sold in 1997. She was taken to Hobart in 1998 where there are plans as of 2003 to preserve her as a museum ship.
 HMS Curlew was a Naval Air Station near St Merryn, Cornwall, previously named . She was HMS Vulture from her commissioning in 1940 until 1952, when she was renamed HMS Curlew.  She was closed in 1956 and sold in 1959.

Royal Navy ship names